Alan or Allan Cox may refer to:
 Alan Cox (computer programmer) (born 1968), British computer programmer and Linux developer
 Alan Cox (actor) (born 1970), English actor
 Alan Cox (footballer) (1920–1993), footballer for Tranmere Rovers
 Alan Cox (radio personality) (born 1971), radio host
 Allan Cox (author) (born 1937), American consultant and author
 Allan Cox (cricketer) (1873–1896), Barbadian cricketer
 Allan Leslie Cox (born 1927), Canadian politician in the Legislative Assembly of British Columbia
 Allan V. Cox (1926–1987), American geophysicist